The Mindanao Pulse is published every Tuesday with business and editorial office located at Tinikling St., Dimson Compound, Lanzona Subd., Matina, Davao City.

Newspapers published in Davao City
Weekly newspapers published in the Philippines